Lucas Watzenrode the Younger (sometimes Watzelrode and Waisselrod; ; ; 30 October 1447 – 29 March 1512) was Prince-Bishop of Warmia (Ermland) and patron to his nephew, astronomer Nicolaus Copernicus.

Early life
The family and its name stemmed from the Silesian village of Weizenrodau, now Pszenno. Watzenrode was born in Thorn (Toruń), son of the merchant Lucas Watzenrode the Elder (1400–62). He studied at Jagiellonian University, and at the universities of Cologne and Bologna.

After his sister Barbara and her husband Niklas Koppernigk died circa 1483, Lucas cared for their four children, Katharina, Barbara, Andreas and Nicolaus, the last of whom would become known as astronomer Nicolaus Copernicus.

Historic background
The Bishopric of Warmia, previously part of the Monastic State of the Teutonic Knights, had, with the Second Peace of Thorn (1466), come under the protection of the King of Poland. Based on that treaty, the Polish King had the right to appoint the Bishop. Neither the Warmia chapter, however, nor their newly elected bishop, Nicolaus von Tüngen (1467–89), acknowledged the King's right to do so.

Poland contested von Tüngen's election, and this led to the War of the Priests (1467–79) and the First Treaty of Piotrków Trybunalski (1479), by which the chapter was obliged to seek consensus with the Polish king. The Bishopric of Warmia was made suffragan to the Archbishopric of Riga, then headed by Archbishop Michael Hildebrand.

Bishop

This agreement was somewhat vague, as shown in the 1489 election of the next bishop, Lucas Watzenrode, who was mitred by Pope Innocent VIII against the explicit wishes of King Casimir IV Jagiellon, who would have preferred that one of his sons, Frederic, become Bishop of Warmia. Watzenrode resisted, and when Casimir died in 1492 and was succeeded by John I Albert, Watzenrode could finally establish the exemption of the Bishopric from Riga. With the Second Treaty of Piotrków Trybunalski (1512), later bishops accepted a limited influence of the Polish King on elections. The Holy See considered the Bishopric exempt until 1992, when it was made an archbishopric, which by its nature is exempt.

Watzenrode, a successful organizer of his territory's internal affairs, resided at Heilsber, now Lidzbark. He reorganized the cathedral school and planned to found a university at Elbing, now Elbląg. He argued that the Teutonic Order had fulfilled its mission in the Baltic region, by then converted to Christianity, and proposed sending the Order to more heathen regions. The Ottoman Empire was an ongoing threat and had taken over large parts of Europe, and the Bishop suggested that the Order "do battle with the Turks."

The Bishopric was exposed to repeated armed attacks by the Teutonic Order, which attempted to regain the territory. Poland sought to rescind the Prince-Bishopric's autonomy, hoping to force the surrender of its prerogatives to the Polish crown. In this area of conflict, Watzenrode guarded the interests of Warmia and maintained friendly relations with Poland. He was a long-time opponent of the Teutonic Knights, and shortly after his death it was rumored that he had been poisoned by them.

Family

Watzenrode looked after his orphaned two nephews and two nieces. Katharina married businessman and city councilor Barthel Gertner, while Barbara became a Benedictine nun. Watzenrode sent the brothers Nicolaus (Copernicus) and Andreas to study at the Kraków Academy and in Italy (Bologna, Padua, Ferrara). After his studies, Copernicus assisted his uncle in administrative matters and was his closest advisor as well as his personal physician.

Watzenrode also took care of his son Philipp Teschner, whose mother was the daughter of the rector of the Johannes school in Thorn. When Watzenrode became bishop he arranged for Philipp Teschner to become mayor of Braunsberg (now Braniewo).

Lucas Watzenrode the Younger died in Thorn (Toruń) during his return from an official journey.

Notes

References
 Bücherei Danzig, J. Kretzmer, Liber de episcopatu et episcopi Varmiensis ex vetusto Chronico Bibliotheca Heilsbergensis, 1593
 Christoph Hartknoch, Preußische Kirchen-Historia, Frankfurt a.M., 1668
 M.G. Centner, Geehrte und Gelehrte Thorner, Thorn 1763
 A. Semrau, "Katalog der Geschlechter der Schöffenbank und des Ratsstuhles in der Altstadt Thorn 1233-1602", in: Mitteilungen des Copernicus-Vereins für Wissenschaft und Kunst zu Thorn 46 (1938)
 
 Poczet biskupów warmińskich, Olsztyn 1998
 Jürgen Hamel: Nicolaus Copernicus. - Spektrum Verlag: Heidelberg, 1994.

Further reading
Górski Karol, Łukasz Watzenrode : życie i działalność polityczna (1447-1512), Wrocław 1973.

1447 births
1512 deaths
15th-century Roman Catholic bishops in Poland
Jagiellonian University alumni
Bishops of Warmia
Nicolaus Copernicus
People from Toruń
People from the State of the Teutonic Order
Canons of Warmia
Canons of Włocławek
University of Bologna alumni